Sama TV is a television station based in Damascus, Syria since September 7, 2012. Sama TV is a sister channel of defunct Addounia TV.

Programs
Sama TV features a variety of general-interest programs. Many programs are shown on the channel; some of them are:

 Nabed al-Sharq (Pulse of the East, نبض الشرق)
 Ahwal al-Nas (Conditions of the people, أحوال الناس)
 Ajandet Hiwar (Dialogue Agenda, أجندة حوار)
 Rasamil (رساميل)
 Sabah al Khair (Good Morning, صباح الخير)
 Sama Café (سما كافيه)
 Tafasil (Details, تفاصيل)
 Classico (كلاسيكو)
 Eshha Sah (Live properly, عيشها صح)
 Ghazel al-Banat (The Flirtation of Girls, غزل البنات)
 Hashtag (هاش تاغ)
 Wahesh al-Buhaira (Lake monster, وحش البحيرة)
 Main News Bulletin (نشرة الأخبار الرئيسية)
 Local News Bulletin (نشرة الأخبار المحلية)

Presenters

Sama TV's current presenters includes:

News anchors: Nizar Al-Farra (نزار الفرا), Hanaa Al-Saleh (هناء الصالح), Ruaa Saker (رؤى صقر) and

Other anchors: Rana Koueter (رنا كويتر), Makhlouf Naama (مخلوف الناعمة),.

Correspondents which are making also reports for Addounia TV: Ahmad al-Aaqel (أحمد العاقل), Kinda al-Khidr (كندة الخضر), Ata Farhat (عطا فرحات), Kinana Allouche (كنانة علوش).

... Social media team : Anas othman(أنس عثمان), Firass Haider (فراس حيدر).

References

External links
Sama TV official website 
Sama TV live stream 
 
 
 

2012 establishments in Syria
Arabic-language television stations
Television channels in Syria
Television channels and stations established in 2012
Mass media in Damascus